Svetozar Lj. Jovanović (1895–1951) was a Serbian chemist and assistant professor of chemistry from 1925 to 1941. He specialized in the field of analytical chemistry. 

Jovanović developed a new electroanalytical method for the quantitative determination of antimony
and a method for the separation of copper from zinc by rapid electrolysis. He studied the gravrimetric determination of problems, such as the manufacture of drugs and, in particular, the practical utilization of the country's paraffin shales. He co-authored with Momir Jovanović a book on Principles of Qualitative Chemical Analysis (Serbian: Kvalitativna hemijska aanaliza). He also wrote an article for a Serbian medical journal titled "Diagnostic evaluation of Vidal's reaction".

See also
 Vukić Mićović
 Djordje K. Stefanović
 Pavle Savić
 Marko Leko
 Aleksandar Zega
 Dejan Popović Jekić
 Zivojin Jocic

References 

1895 births
1951 deaths
Analytical chemists
Serbian chemists